Arielle Holmes (born September 17, 1993) is an American actress and writer best known for starring as a lightly fictionalized version of herself in the film Heaven Knows What.

Early life

Holmes is from Bayonne, New Jersey. Her father is an Irish national and was not part of her upbringing. She was raised mostly by relatives in New Jersey.

Drug use and homelessness

Holmes' first experience with crack cocaine was when she smoked with her mother at the age of 12. She dropped out of school in the 10th grade. After leaving school, she moved to New York City to live with her boyfriend Ilya Leontyev. The two fell into heavy drug and alcohol abuse, with Holmes first trying heroin at the age of 17. She was largely homeless for the next three years. Leontyev died of an overdose in Central Park in April 2015.

Career

Holmes was scouted by Josh and Benny Safdie, the directors of Heaven Knows What, in Manhattan's Diamond District while they were working on another film (that would eventually become Uncut Gems). She had been hired as an unpaid intern by a jeweler after he saw her sketching on a subway train.

Intrigued by Holmes' life story, Josh encouraged Arielle to write a memoir, paying her by the page. The resulting unpublished memoir, Mad Love in New York City, served as the basis for Heaven Knows What.

In June 2015, it was announced that Holmes had been cast in Andrea Arnold's American Honey. She also appeared in 2307: Winters Dream, directed by Joey Curtis.

Personal life

Upon the completion of Heaven Knows What, Holmes asked the Safdie brothers to assist her rehabilitation. She received treatment at Lucida on the Intracoastal Waterway in Florida.

Filmography

Film

References

External links
 

American film actresses
Living people
Actors from Bayonne, New Jersey
Actresses from New Jersey
Writers from Bayonne, New Jersey
1993 births
21st-century American women